Estadio Guillermo Vargas Roldán is a multi-use stadium in Alajuela, Costa Rica.  It is currently used mostly for football matches and is the home stadium of Asociación Deportiva Ramonense.  The stadium holds up to 4,000 people.

The stadium was named in December 1978 after former Ramonense club president Guillermo Vargas Roldán, who died in April 2014, aged 82. He had been president of the club for a record 22 years.

References

Guillermo Vargas Roldan
Buildings and structures in Alajuela Province